The  Queen's Tower  is a proposed residential skyscraper to be located at 545 Queen Street in the Brisbane CBD’s north eastern corner. The development will occupy an island site between Queen, Adelaide and Macrossan Streets in Brisbane, Australia.

The 250-metre, 76-storey tower will include 891 luxury residences and 100 serviced apartments in one, two, three and four-bedroom apartment configurations.

Recreation area with swimming pool, café, gymnasium, function space and lush landscaping will be located on podium rooftop. Retail space (approximately 2,500m2) is planned for the ground level. The tower will have Brisbane's deepest basement, 17 levels below the surface, for 853 cars, 71 motorcycles and 752 bicycles. The car park will only be accessible by four car lifts.

A current ten storey commercial building at the site will be demolished.

Development application was lodged with the Brisbane City Council in March 2016.

See also

List of tallest buildings in Brisbane

References

External links
 Building at The Skyscraper Center database 

Skyscrapers in Brisbane
Residential skyscrapers in Australia
Proposed skyscrapers in Australia
Queen Street, Brisbane